Mareda may refer to:

 Mareda, a name for the Natada moth
 Mareda, Croatia, a village near Novigrad, Istria County